Lichfield is a civil parish in the district of Lichfield, Staffordshire, England. It contains 244 listed buildings that are recorded in the National Heritage List for England. Of these, six are listed at Grade I, the highest of the three grades, 32 are at Grade II*, the middle grade, and the others are at Grade II, the lowest grade. The parish consists of the cathedral city of Lichfield. Most of the listed buildings in the parish are houses and associated structures, the earliest of which are timber framed or have timber-framed cores, a high proportion are Georgian in style, and some have been converted for other uses including shops and offices. The other listed buildings include churches, the most important being Lichfield Cathedral, and associated structures including memorials in the churchyards. Among the variety of other listed buildings are a holy well, bridges, the remains of earlier fortifications, almshouses, public houses and hotels, public buildings, schools, statues, a clock tower, a fountain, an engine house, a war memorial, and telephone kiosks.


Key

Buildings

References

Citations

Sources

Buildings and structures in Lichfield
Lichfield